Barys Pankrataw (born 30 December 1982) is a Belarusian footballer (goalkeeper) playing currently for Slutsk.

Honours
BATE Borisov
Belarusian Premier League champion: 2006, 2007
Belarusian Cup winner: 2005–06

External links
 Player profile on BATE website
 
 

1982 births
Living people
People from Mogilev
Sportspeople from Mogilev Region
Belarusian footballers
Association football goalkeepers
FC Spartak Shklov players
FC BATE Borisov players
FC Dinamo Minsk players
FC Granit Mikashevichi players
FC Dnepr Mogilev players
FC Neman Grodno players
FC Belshina Bobruisk players
FC Slutsk players
FC Isloch Minsk Raion players